Bultei is a comune (municipality) in the Province of Sassari in the Italian region Sardinia, located about  north of Cagliari and about  southeast of Sassari.

Bultei borders the following municipalities: Anela, Benetutti, Bono, Nughedu San Nicolò, Pattada.

Twin towns
 Fiorano Modenese, Italy
 Maranello, Italy, since 1986

References 

Cities and towns in Sardinia